Air Vice Marshal Gregory Agboneni (born 30 August 1948)  is a former Nigerian soldier and military administrator of Adamawa and Cross River states.

Biography
Agboneni attended US Air Force Pilot Training as a foreign student in 1971–1972, after which he served as a soldier and fighter pilot for the Nigerian Air Force. Furing the military regime of Head of State General Sani Abacha Agboneni was appointed as Military Administrator of Adamawa State, an office in which he served between December 1993 and September 1994, and of Cross River State, where he served between September 1994 and August 1996. He was also the Commander of the Order of the Niger.

AVM Gregory has a degree in Aeronautics and masters in strategic studies. He is also a winner of the British R.A.F Andover Award.

See also
List of Governors of Cross River State

References

1948 births
Living people
Governors of Adamawa State
Nigerian military governors of Cross River State
Commanders of the Order of the Niger